The 4th Annual Indonesian Movie Awards was held on May 7, 2010, at the JITEC Mangga Dua Square, North Jakarta. The award show was hosted by Okky Lukman and Choky Sitohang. And the nominations have been announced for the category of Favorite, which will be chosen by the public via SMS. As for the category of Best, will be selected by a jury that has been appointed. This time, there are 36 films which consists of 15 drama film, 11 comedy film, and other like horror, religion, and documentary film. And the number of awards up for grabs this time there are 15, respectively 8 Best and 7 Favorite.

With everything combined, Ketika Cinta Bertasbih and Jermal compete as the film with receiving the most nominations with nine each, and Queen Bee followed of receiving with seven nominations. Announcement of the winners will be held on May 5, 2010. On May 5, 2010, Ketika Cinta Bertasbih into a film that took home the most awards, with three awards, followed by Ketika Cinta Bertasbih 2, Jermal, and Serigala Terakhir taking home with two awards each. While other films get one award each.

Nominees and winners

Best
Winners are listed first and highlighted in boldface.

Favorite
Winners are listed first and highlighted in boldface.

Film with most nominations and awards

Most nominations

The following film received most nominations:

Most wins
The following film received most nominations:

References

External links
 Laporan Indonesian Movie Awards

Indonesian
2010 in Indonesia
Indonesian Movie Actor Awards